William James Johnson (1871 – 30 July 1916) was an Australian politician and soldier.

Born in Yass, New South Wales, he received a primary education before becoming a coachbuilder. He was involved in local politics as a member of Auburn Council. In 1910, he was elected to the Australian House of Representatives as the Labor member for Robertson, defeating Henry Willis. He held the seat until 1913, when he was defeated by William Fleming, representing the Commonwealth Liberal Party.

Johnson enlisted as a Private on 14 August 1915 and served in the Second Battalion in France. While there, his Division was addressed by then Prime Minister of Australia Billy Hughes and former Prime Minister Andrew Fisher, then serving as Australian High Commissioner to Britain, and Hughes recognised Johnson in the crowd. The former colleagues were seen laughing and reminiscing for some time. Johnson was wounded at Pozières, and died of his wounds in Étaples on 30 July 1916.

References

Australian Labor Party members of the Parliament of Australia
Members of the Australian House of Representatives for Robertson
Members of the Australian House of Representatives
Australian military personnel killed in World War I
Coachbuilders of Australia
1871 births
1916 deaths
People from Yass
20th-century Australian politicians
Mayors of Auburn
Australian Army soldiers